Canterbury is a region of New Zealand, located in the central-eastern South Island. It is home to a population of 

The region in its current form was established in 1989 during nationwide local government reforms. The Kaikoura District joined the region in 1992 following the abolition of the Nelson-Marlborough Regional Council.

Christchurch, the South Island's largest city and the country's second-largest urban area, is the seat of the region and home to  percent of the region's population. Other major towns and cities include Timaru, Ashburton, Rangiora and Rolleston.

History

Natural history 

The land, water, flora, and fauna of Waitaha/Canterbury has a long history stretching from creation of the greywacke basement rocks that make up the Kā Tiritiri o te Moana/Southern Alps to the arrival of the first humans. This history is linked to the creation of the earth, the solidification and development of tectonic plates, the development of oceans and then life itself.

The region is a part of the larger Zealandia continent, itself a part of the larger Australian and Pacific tectonic plates. In the first instance, the land is based upon the constructive tectonic forces of this convergent and transformational tectonic plate boundary. In the second instance, the erosive forces of rain, snow, ice, and rock grinding against rock have developed large gravel fans that extend out from the mountains. In the third instance, there is volcanism punching through the basement rocks and blanket of sediments to the surface. Upon this solid foundation, and slowly over the billions of years, life made up of a countless generations of interconnected adaptations developed into the unique flora and fauna of Aotearoa New Zealand. The remnants populations of these unique species are visible today in the publicly protected conservation lands.

The species of Waitaha/Canterbury were adapted to the climate and geography that traverses inland from the coastline to the highest peaks, and from the warmer climes in the north to the colder in the south.

Māori history 

The history of the human activity in the Waitaha/Canterbury Region of Aotearoa/New Zealand dates back to settlement by the Māori people in about the tenth century. The earliest settlers in Canterbury appear to have been the people described as the Moa-hunters, arriving about the tenth century  near the time of the traditional discovery of the South Island by Rākaihautū. Traces of the presence of these people are found in camp and burial sites near river mouths, the northern valleys of Banks Peninsula and on Hikuraki Bay. The burial sites of the Moa-hunters containing moa eggs, ornamental artifacts and whale's tooth pendants show that their culture differed from that of the later Maori.

Following on from these times, the Waitaha people thrived on the abundance of the land and sea. This attracted other settlers from the north, Ngati Mamoe and following then Ngāi Tahu. The iwi/Tribes at times shared the resources and lived together, and at other times squabbled and fought amongst each other. The Abundance of the land was diminished by the burning and destruction of the human activity. This led to a semi-nomadic lifestyle where the main settlements where near the coast to access Kaimoana/seafood and groups would go on food gathering missions further afield. In this way much of Te Waipounamu was explored and given named by Maori for their permanent and seasonal homes, access routes, and key navigation landmarks.

In the early 19th century, tribes began to trade with Europeans who brought muskets and other tools. Armed northern tribes undertook invasions to the south island – to protect their homes, most of the tribes of the south island unified with Ngāi Tahu to fight back against these attacks. From the 1830s onwards the presence of Europeans and other nationalities increases in the Waitaha/Canterbury region.

Colonisation  
In 1848, Edward Gibbon Wakefield, a Briton, and John Robert Godley, an Anglo-Irish aristocrat, founded the Canterbury Association to establish an Anglican colony in the South Island. The colony was based upon theories developed by Wakefield while in prison for eloping with a woman not-of-age. Due to ties to the University of Oxford, the Canterbury Association succeeded in raising sufficient funds and recruiting middle-class and upper-class settlers. In April 1850, a preliminary group led by Godley landed at Port Cooper – modern-day Lyttelton Harbour / Whakaraupō – and established a port, housing and shops in preparation for the main body of settlers. In December 1850, the first wave of 750 settlers arrived at Lyttelton in a fleet of four ships.

Following 1850, the province's economy developed with the introduction of sheep farming. The Canterbury region's tussock plains in particular were suitable for extensive sheep farming. Since they were highly valued by settlers for their meat and wool, there were over half a million sheep in the region by the early 1850s. By the 1860s, this figure had risen to three million. During this period, the architect Benjamin Mountfort designed many civic and ecclesiastical buildings in the Gothic Revival style.

Canterbury Province

The Canterbury Province was formed in 1853 following the passing of the New Zealand Constitution Act 1852. It was formed from part of New Munster Province and covered the middle part of the South Island, stretching from the east coast to the west coast. The province was abolished, along with other provinces of New Zealand, when the Abolition of the Provinces Act came into force on 1 Nov 1876. The modern Canterbury Region has slightly different boundaries, particularly in the north, where it includes some districts from the old Nelson Province.

2010–2011 earthquakes

September 2010 

An earthquake with magnitude 7.1 occurred in the South Island of New Zealand at Saturday 04:35 am local time, 4 September 2010 (16:35 UTC, 3 September 2010).

Sewers were damaged, gas and water lines were broken, and power to up to 75% of the city was disrupted. Among the facilities impacted by lack of power was the Christchurch Hospital, which was forced to use emergency generators in the immediate aftermath of the quake.

A local state of emergency was declared at 10:16 am on 4 September for the city, and evacuations of parts were planned to begin later in the day. People inside the Christchurch city centre were evacuated, and the city's central business district remained closed until 5 September. A curfew from 7 pm on 4 September to 7 am on 5 September was put in place. The New Zealand Army was also deployed to assist police and enforce the curfew. All schools were closed until 8 September so they could be checked.

Christchurch International Airport was closed following the earthquake and flights in and out of it cancelled. It reopened at 1:30 pm following inspection of the main runway.

The earthquake was reported to have caused widespread damage and power outages. 63 aftershocks were also reported in the first 48 hours with three registering 5.2 magnitude. Christchurch residents reported chimneys falling in through roofs, cracked ceilings and collapsed brick walls. The total insurance costs of this event were estimated to reach up to $11 billion according to the New Zealand Treasury.

February 2011 

It was centred just to the north of Lyttelton, 10 kilometres south east of Christchurch, at a depth of 5 km.
Although lower on the moment magnitude scale than the quake of September 2010, the intensity and violence of the ground shaking was measured to be VIII on the MMI and among the strongest ever recorded globally in an urban area due to the shallowness and proximity of the epicentre. Early assessments indicated that about a third of the buildings in the Central Business District would have to be demolished.

In contrast to the September 2010 quake, the February 2011 earthquake struck on a busy weekday afternoon. This, along with the strength of the quakes, and the proximity to the city centre resulted in 181 deaths.

This event promptly resulted in the declaration of New Zealand's first National State of Emergency. Many buildings and landmarks were severely damaged, including the iconic Shag Rock and Christchurch Cathedral.

International bodies quickly offered assistance. Contingents of Urban Search and Rescue (USAR) soon arrived. Teams were provided by Australia, United States, Singapore, Britain, Taiwan, Japan and China.

The Royal New Zealand Navy was involved immediately. HMNZS Canterbury, which was docked at Lyttelton when the quake struck, was involved in providing local community assistance, in particular by providing hot meals.

After inspection, the runway at Christchurch Airport was found to be in good order. Due to the demand of citizens wishing to leave the city, the national airline Air New Zealand, offered a $50 Domestic Standby airfare. The Air New Zealand CEO increased the domestic airline traffic from Christchurch to Wellington and Auckland. Thousands of people took up this offer to relocate temporarily in the wake of the event.

On 1 March at 12:51, a week after the tragedy, New Zealand observed a two-minute silence.

June 2011 

On 13 June 2011 at about 1:00 pm New Zealand time, Christchurch was again rocked by a magnitude 5.7 quake, followed by a magnitude 6.3 quake (initially thought to be 6.0) at 2:20 pm, centred in a similar location to that of the February quake with a depth of 6.0 kilometres. Dozens of aftershocks occurred over the following days, including several over magnitude 4.

Phone lines and power were lost in some suburbs, and liquefaction surfaced mainly in the eastern areas of the city which were worst affected following the aftershocks. Many residents in and around the hillside suburb of Sumner self-evacuated.

Further damage was reported to buildings inside the cordoned central business district, with an estimate of 75 additional buildings needing demolition. Among the buildings further damaged was the Christchurch Cathedral, which lost its iconic rose window, a factor reducing the likelihood of the cathedral being restored.

There was only one death recorded following the quake; however, there were many injuries.

Geography 

The area administered by the Canterbury Regional Council consists of all the river catchments on the east coast of the South Island from that of the Waiau Toa / Clarence River, north of Kaikōura, to that of the Waitaki River, in South Canterbury. It is New Zealand's largest region by area, with an area of 45,346 km2.

Canterbury was traditionally bounded in the north by the Conway River, to the west by the Southern Alps, and to the south by the Waitaki River. The area is commonly divided into North Canterbury (north of the Rakaia River to the Conway River), Mid Canterbury (from the Rakaia River to the Rangitata River), South Canterbury (south of the Rangitata River to the Waitaki River) and Christchurch City.

Climate

Demographics

The region is home to % of New Zealand's population.

Canterbury Region had a population of 599,694 at the 2018 New Zealand census, an increase of 60,261 people (11.2%) since the 2013 census, and an increase of 77,862 people (14.9%) since the 2006 census. There were 225,408 households. There were 299,397 males and 300,297 females, giving a sex ratio of 1.0 males per female. The median age was 38.7 years (compared with 37.4 years nationally), with 109,164 people (18.2%) aged under 15 years, 121,833 (20.3%) aged 15 to 29, 272,718 (45.5%) aged 30 to 64, and 95,982 (16.0%) aged 65 or older.

Of those at least 15 years old, 104,658 (21.3%) people had a bachelor or higher degree, and 87,948 (17.9%) people had no formal qualifications. The median income was $33,700, compared with $31,800 nationally. 83,262 people (17.0%) earned over $70,000 compared to 17.2% nationally. The employment status of those at least 15 was that 250,845 (51.1%) people were employed full-time, 75,861 (15.5%) were part-time, and 15,864 (3.2%) were unemployed.

Urban areas

Culture and identity
In the 2018 census, 82.4% were European/Pākehā, 9.4% Māori, 3.2% Pacific peoples, 11.1% Asian, and 2.6% other ethnicities. People may identify with more than one ethnicity.

The percentage of people born overseas was 23.2, compared with 27.1% nationally.

Although some people objected to giving their religion, 51.0% had no religion, 37.1% were Christian, 1.3% were Hindu, 0.8% were Muslim, 0.7% were Buddhist and 2.5% had other religions.

In the 2013 census, just under 20 percent of Canterbury's population was born overseas, compared to 25 percent for New Zealand as a whole. The British Isles remains the largest region of origin, accounting for 36.5 percent of the overseas-born population in Canterbury. Around a quarter of Canterbury's overseas-born population at the 2013 Census had been living in New Zealand for less than five years, and 11 percent had been living in New Zealand for less than two years (i.e. they moved to New Zealand after the 2011 Christchurch earthquake).

Anglicanism is the largest Christian denomination in Canterbury with 14.8 percent affiliating, while Catholicism is the second-largest with 12.7 percent affiliating.

Economy

The subnational gross domestic product (GDP) of Canterbury was estimated at NZ$37.51 billion in the year to March 2019, 12.4% of New Zealand's national GDP. The regional GDP per capita was estimated at $60,101 in the same period. In the year to March 2018, primary industries contributed $2.99 billion (8.3%) to the regional GDP, goods-producing industries contributed $8.36 billion (23.1%), service industries contributed $21.73 billion (60.0%), and taxes and duties contributed $3.10 billion (8.6%).

The Canterbury region's economy is diversified into agriculture, industry, fishing, forestry, tourism and energy resources such as coal and hydroelectricity. Its agriculture sector is also diversified into dairy farming, sheep farming and horticulture particularly viticulture. The strength of the region's agricultural economy is displayed every November at the Canterbury A&P Show. The show coincides with the regional anniversary day and Cup Week. During the interwar period, agricultural productivity was boosted by the introduction of mechanization, lime and the improvement of seed stocks. Canterbury is also New Zealand's main producer of cereal crops such as wheat, barley and oats. As of 2002, the region produced 60.7% of the nation's supply of wheat, 51.1% of its barley stocks and 43.7% of its supply of oats.

Canterbury has 25,065 hectares of horticultural land, the largest area in New Zealand. The largest crops are potatoes (4,330 ha), peas and beans (2,700 ha), wine grapes (1,770 ha), berries (1,100 ha), and onions (1,000 ha). The region produces half of the New Zealand's mushrooms, nuts and berries.

The region's viticulture industry was established by French settlers in Akaroa. Since then, wine-growing is concentrated into two regions: Waipara and Burnham. Recently there have been vintages from plantings from Kurow further to the south. White wine has typically predominated in Canterbury from Riesling, Sauvignon blanc, Chardonnay, Gewürztraminer, and to a lesser extent Pinot blanc and Pinot gris. Pinot noir has had some success in the province particularly in Waipara.

The manufacturing industry is the second-largest contributor to the Canterbury economy. With so many agricultural businesses, there is especially room for development and innovation in products for this sector, as well as construction and engineering as a result of the 2011 Christchurch earthquake. 2,000 local manufacturing companies employ 23,000 workers, contributing an estimated $2.2 billion NZD to the national GDP.

Environment

Like much of the Canterbury-Otago tussock grasslands the Canterbury Plains have been highly modified since human settlement and now support a large agricultural industry. Prior to the arrival of Māori settlers in the 13th century, much of the modern Canterbury region was covered in scrub and beech forests. Forest fires destroyed much of the original forest cover which was succeeded by tussock grassland. By the 19th century, only ten percent of this forest cover remained and the European settlers introduced several new exotic grass, lupin, pine and macrocarpa that gradually supplanted the native vegetation. Much of the native vegetation was isolated to the alpine zones and Banks Peninsula. From a minimum of about one percent of its original forest cover in circa 1900, the amount of forest on Banks Peninsula has increased.

The amount of dairy farming is increasing with a corresponding increase in demand for water. Water use is now becoming a contentious issue in Canterbury. Lowland rivers and streams are generally polluted and some of the aquifers are being overdrawn. The Central Plains Water scheme is a proposal for water storage that has attracted much controversy. The Canterbury Water Management Strategy is one of the many means being used to address the water issue.

The Canterbury mudfish (kowaro) is an endangered species that is monitored by the Department of Conservation.

Government and politics

Local government
The Canterbury region is administered by the Canterbury Regional Council. The area includes ten territorial authorities, including Christchurch City Council and part of the Waitaki District, the other part of which is in Otago. Following the local government reform of 1989, Kaikoura District was part of the Nelson-Marlborough Region. That region was later abolished and replaced with three unitary authorities. Kaikoura was too small to function as an independent unitary authority and was moved under the jurisdiction of the Canterbury Regional Council in 1992. However Kaikoura remains part of Marlborough in the minds of many people. In 2006, the Banks Peninsula District was merged into Christchurch City following a 2005 referendum.

National government
The Canterbury Region is covered by ten general electorates and one Māori electorate. The city of Christchurch as a whole consists of five of these electorates, while the electorate of Waimakariri contains a mix of Christchurch and exurban Canterbury. The Banks Peninsula, Wigram, Christchurch Central, Christchurch East and Ilam electorates are currently held by the governing Labour Party members Tracey McLellan, Megan Woods, Duncan Webb, and Poto Williams respectively.  Meanwhile, the Waimakariri electorate is currently held by member of the opposition (National Party's) Matt Doocey. In contrast to Christchurch, much of the surrounding Canterbury region is dominated by the National Party due to its ties to rural farming and business interests. The large Kaikōura electorate covers all of the Marlborough Region and northern Canterbury and is represented by National MP Stuart Smith. The substantial Waitaki electorate covers most of South Canterbury and neighbouring North Otago. Rangitata and Selwyn are held by Labour MP Jo Luxton and National MP Nicola Grigg respectively, while Waitaki is represented by National MP Jacqui Dean.

Under the Maori seats system, Canterbury is part of the large Te Tai Tonga electorate which covers the entire South Island, the surrounding islands and most of Wellington in the North Island. It is currently held by Labour Party MP Rino Tirikatene.

Judicially, the region is served by four District Courts at Christchurch, Ashburton, Timaru and Kaikōura, and two High Courts at Christchurch and Timaru. The Christchurch High Court also hosts a divisional court of the Court of Appeal.

Transport
State Highway 1 runs the length of Canterbury, connecting north to Blenheim and the Cook Strait ferry terminal at Picton and south to Oamaru, Dunedin and Invercargill.

Christchurch International Airport, located in Harewood on the northwest outskirts of Christchurch, is the region's main airport. Regular flights operate from Christchurch to most major centres in New Zealand, as well as Australia, the Pacific Islands and eastern Asia. Timaru's Richard Pearse Airport serves South Canterbury with daily flights to Wellington.

Education

Canterbury is served by 292 primary and secondary schools educating around 94,000 students from ages 5 to 18. Around 13 percent of students attend state-integrated schools and 5 percent attend private schools, with the remaining 82 percent attending state schools.

Both Christchurch and Timaru have single-sex state secondary schools.

Canterbury has two universities: the University of Canterbury located in western Christchurch, and Lincoln University located in Lincoln.

Sport

The region is home the Crusaders who play in the Super Rugby competition. The Crusaders also represent other provinces in the upper South Island but are based in Christchurch. They were formerly known as the Canterbury Crusaders.

In provincial rugby Canterbury is represented by three unions; Canterbury, Mid Canterbury and South Canterbury. For historical reasons players from Kaikoura District still play for the Marlborough Rugby Union which is part of the Tasman Provincial team (Nelson/Marlborough Unions combined).

The Canterbury Kings are Canterbury's cricket team in New Zealand's Super Smash. Other sporting teams include the Mainland Tactix (netball), Canterbury United FC (football) and Canterbury Rams (basketball).

Film location
Canterbury was the location used in the filming The Lord of the Rings for the fictional city of Edoras, Rohan, on Mount Sunday, as well as Helm's deep backdrop, several miles down the valley.

See also
2010 Canterbury earthquake
February 2011 Christchurch earthquake
June 2011 Christchurch earthquake
November 2016 Kaikoura earthquake
Water pollution in Canterbury, New Zealand

References

External links

 Environment Canterbury (Canterbury Regional Council)
 Canterbury Biodiversity, Environment Canterbury

 
English-New Zealand culture
Irish-New Zealand culture